Tanamarina or Tanamarina Bekisopa is a rural commune in Madagascar. It belongs to the district of Ikalamavony, which is a part of Haute Matsiatra Region. The population of the commune was estimated to be approximately 10,000 in 2001 commune census.

Only primary schooling is available. The majority 50% of the population of the commune are farmers, while an additional 50% receives their livelihood from raising livestock. The most important crops are rice and cassava, while other important agricultural products are beans and taro.

Mining
The iron ore mine in Bekisopa.

References

Populated places in Haute Matsiatra